Maesglase is a mountain in Snowdonia, North Wales, situated approximately four miles to the south-west of Aran Fawddwy. It is the highest of the Dyfi Hills.

It can be reached by an easy but steep walk through the forestry from Dinas Mawddwy or directly from the bwlch on the A470. Ascending Maesglase provides an opportunity to climb several other nearby peaks including Maen-Du, Craig Rhiw-erch, Waun-oer, Craig Portas and Cribin Fawr which are linked by a series of ridges and arêtes.

The precise location of the summit is the subject of some confusion. Traditionally, the top of Maen Du ( at ) was regarded as Maesglase's summit. The geomorphology of these mountains is classical U-shaped glacial valleys with textbook examples of hanging valleys and intersecting valleys.
 
The eastern slopes are devoted to sheep farming whilst the western slopes are intensively forested.

Above the semi-improved grassland is some bracken but much of the higher ground is covered in typical Calluna / Erica communities interspersed with large areas of Juncus, Carex and Sphagnum bogs. The tops of Cribin Fawr are flat expanses of peat-hags. On the eastern flanks Bilberry (Vaccinium myrtillus) grows in abundance with Cowberry (Vaccinium vitis-idaea) common on the highest ground.

To the south lie the parallel ridges leading to Mynydd Dolgoed and Mynydd Gartheiniog.

The site is the location of the Welsh-language novel O! Tyn y Gorchudd! by Angharad Price.

References

External links
 www.geograph.co.uk : photos of Maesglase and surrounding area

Mawddwy
Mountains and hills of Gwynedd
Mountains and hills of Snowdonia
Hewitts of Wales
Marilyns of Wales
Nuttalls
Dyfi Hills